The Men's marathon athletics events for the 2020 Summer Paralympics took place in Tokyo on September 5, 2021. A total of 3 events were contested over this distance.

Medal summary
The following is a summary of the medals awarded across all marathon events.

References

Athletics at the 2020 Summer Paralympics
2021 in men's athletics
Summer Paralympics